Fall Creek may refer to:

In the United States

Streams
Fall Creek (San Mateo County, California)
Fall Creek (Indiana)
Fall Creek (Missouri)
Fall Creek (Cape Fear River tributary), a stream in Lee County, North Carolina
Fall Creek (Middle Fork Willamette River), in Oregon
Fall Creek (New York), in Ithaca, New York

Other water bodies
Fall Creek Falls (Texas), a waterfall of Lake Buchanan (Texas)
Fall Creek Lake in Oregon

Populated places
Fall Creek, Ithaca, a neighborhood in Ithaca, New York
Fall Creek, Oregon, an unincorporated community
Fall Creek, Texas, a neighborhood in Harris County, Texas
Fall Creek, Wisconsin, a village

See also
 Fall Creek Township (disambiguation)
 Fall River (disambiguation)
 Falls River (disambiguation)